Tissotia is a genus of ammonites belonging to the family Tissotiidae.

These fast-moving nektonic carnivores lived in the Cretaceous period (89.3 to 84.9 Ma).

Species 
Species within the genus Tissotia include:
 Tissotia fourneli  Bayle, 1849
 Tissotia halli  Knechtel, 1947
 Tissotia hedbergi  Benavides-Caceres, 1956
 Tissotia steinmanni  Lissón, 1908

Distribution
Fossils of the species within this genus have been found in the Cretaceous sediments of Brazil, Cameroon, Egypt, France, Nigeria, Peru and Spain.

References

External links
 Paleomania

Ammonitida genera
Acanthoceratoidea
Cretaceous ammonites
Ammonites of South America
Cretaceous Brazil
Cretaceous Peru
Cretaceous Europe
Cretaceous Africa